Oliver Forbes Davidson (born 28 July 2004) is a Scottish cricketer. While an academy player at Worcestershire, Davidson represented Scotland national under-19s at the ICC Under-19 World Cup European qualification tournament in September 2021, where he took 14 wickets. He went on to represent Scotland at the 2022 ICC Under-19 Cricket World Cup in January 2022.

In May 2022, Davidson was selected in Scotland's squad for the 2022 United States Tri-Nation series, which was the twelfth round of the 2019–2023 ICC Cricket World Cup League 2. He made his One Day International (ODI) for Scotland against the United Arab Emirates national cricket team on 3 June 2022.

References

External links
 

2004 births
Living people
Scottish cricketers
Scotland One Day International cricketers
Cricketers from Edinburgh
People educated at Bromsgrove School
Worcestershire cricketers